Jack Rathbone (born May 20, 1999) is an American professional ice hockey defenseman currently playing for the Abbotsford Canucks in the American Hockey League (AHL) as a prospect to the Vancouver Canucks of the National Hockey League (NHL).

Early life
Rathbone was born on May 20, 1999, in West Roxbury, Massachusetts to parents Jason and Beth. His father was a draft pick of the New York Islanders in 1988 and coached him during his time with the Cape Cod Whalers. Rathbone is also the oldest of three siblings, a brother and sister, and grew up a Boston Bruins fan.

Playing career

Amateur
Growing up in Massachusetts, Rathbone played ice hockey for the Mass Midget Select League's Cape Cod Whalers and Dexter Southfield School. During his first year with the U18 Whalers team, he recorded eight goals and 18 points which he superseded the following year by posting 16 goals and 35 points in 22 games. Although Rathbone missed four weeks of the season due to a concussion, he was still considered a ALL-USA Player of the Year candidate. Rathbone committed to play NCAA Division I ice hockey with the Harvard Crimson in 2015 but chose to complete his education at Dexter rather than join the United States Hockey League (USHL) to remain closer to his family and autistic brother.

Throughout the 2016–17 season, Rathbone split his time between the Whalers, Dexter, and Youngstown Phantoms in the USHL. He played four games with the Phantoms and recorded one assist. During his senior year at Dexter, Rathbone was named captain and was ranked 57th overall by the NHL Central Scouting Bureau in their final ranking of North American skaters. Prior to graduating, Rathbone was drafted 95th overall in the 2017 NHL Entry Draft by the Vancouver Canucks.

Collegiate
Rathbone joined the Harvard Crimson men's ice hockey team to compete in their 2018–19 season and received the Don Parsons Memorial Scholarship in recognition of his "character, community service, leadership and academics." As a freshman at Harvard, Rathbone skated in 33 games and finished the season with seven goals and 15 assists for 22 points. His first collegiate goal came against the Quinnipiac Bobcats on November 2, 2018, and he finished the year with a seven-game point-streak. His seventh point in the same amount of games came during a loss against Clarkson which effectively knocked Harvard out of the ECAC playoffs. As he completed the season second amongst league rookies in points, he was named to the ECAC Hockey All-Rookie Team.

Rathbone re-joined the Harvard Crimson for his sophomore year and recorded 31 points in 28 games as the season was cut short due to COVID-19. Prior to the seasons' cancellation, Rathbone earned national recognition with an election to the First Team All-ECAC Hockey team and AHCA All-American First Team. Once the season was cancelled, Rathbone returned home and debated whether he should return to college or start his professional career.

Professional

On July 14, 2020, Rathbone signed a three-year entry-level contract with the Canucks, effectively concluding his collegiate career. On May 6, 2021, Rathbone scored his first NHL goal in a 6–3 win against the Edmonton Oilers.

International play
Rathbone was named to Team USA to compete during the 2015 Under-17 Five Nations Tournament. He recorded two goals in their final game against Germany to cinch  first place at the tournament.

Career statistics

Awards and honors

References

External links
 

1999 births
Living people
Abbotsford Canucks players
American ice hockey defensemen
Harvard Crimson men's ice hockey players
People from West Roxbury, Boston
Utica Comets players
Vancouver Canucks draft picks
Vancouver Canucks players
Youngstown Phantoms players
AHCA Division I men's ice hockey All-Americans